Harold Clayton (1954–2015) is a sculptor.

Harold Clayton is also the name of:

Harold Clayton (Coronation Street), fictional character
Sir Harold Clayton, 10th Baronet, of Marden (1877–1951), of the Clayton baronets
Harold Clayton, co-songwriter of "We Can Do It"
Harold Clayton, participant in Lawn Bowls at the 1970 British Commonwealth Games

See also
Harry Clayton (disambiguation)
Clayton (disambiguation)